James John Neville Heywood (born 24 September 1982) is an English cricketer who played first-class cricket from 2003 to 2008.

James Heywood was educated at Worth School in East Sussex, and Pembroke College, Cambridge. A wicket-keeper, he was a regular member of the Cambridge University team from 2003 to 2008, playing six times in the University Match, a Cambridge record.

References

External links

1982 births
Living people
English cricketers
Cambridge University cricketers
People educated at Worth School
Alumni of Pembroke College, Cambridge
Sportspeople from Eastbourne
Cambridge MCCU cricketers